Edward Philip Benoit (November 26, 1918 – January 22, 1991)  was a former provincial level politician. He served as a member of the Alberta Legislature from 1963 until 1975. He was born in Calgary.

Political career
Benoit was first elected to the Legislative Assembly of Alberta in the 1963 Alberta general election. He won the former riding of Okotoks-High River holding it for the Social Credit party. In that election he won a comfortable plurality of almost seven hundred votes over Progressive Conservative candidate Samuel Brown and two other candidates. He was re-elected to his second term in office in the 1967 Alberta general election barely retaining his seat as he squeaked out a two hundred vote win in a hotly contested race against Progressive Conservative Thomas Hughes and two other candidates.

In 1971 Okotoks-High River was abolished and replaced by the new Highwood electoral district. Benoit ran for his third term in that new riding and won another tight race defeating Eldon Couey of the Progressive Conservatives and another candidate. Benoit was defeated by George Wolstenholme in his bid for a fourth term in office in the 1975 Alberta general election.

Late life
Benoit died on January 22, 1991.

References

External links
Legislative Assembly of Alberta Members Listing

Alberta Social Credit Party MLAs
Politicians from Calgary
1991 deaths
1918 births